The Heritage Tower is a mixed-use commercial and residential building located at 25 West Michigan Avenue in Battle Creek, Michigan. It was originally built as the Old-Merchants National Bank and Trust Co. Building, and designed as an office building. It was listed on the National Register of Historic Places in 2018.

History
In 1929, two large Battle Creek financial institutions merged, forming the Old-Merchants National Bank and Trust Company, which was, at the time, the largest financial institution between Detroit and Chicago. The newly-merged bank decided to commission a new, larger building for their headquarters, and hired the Chicago firm of Weary and Alford to design a new building.  Construction began in early 1930, under the supervision of Detroit contractors, Walbridge and Aldinger. The construction site was also the site of the bank's headquarters at the time, so construction was staged to allow the bank to move into a portion of the new building before the old one was demolished. The building was completed in 1931. At the time, banking offices occupied the first five floors, with rental offices above. At the time of opening, the building was 70% occupied.

However, during the Great Depression, the bank was forced to close its doors.  It reopened in 1935, changing its name to the Security National Bank. The bank remained in the tower through most of the 20th century, and was purchased by Comerica Bank in 1982.  In 1993, the building was sold to Dore Industrial Development, who refurbished it and renamed the building the Heritage Tower. However, the building was eventually vacated and sat empty for years, until it was purchased in 2017 for redevelopment. It will house two retail floors, and 85 apartments above.

Description
The Heritage Tower is a nineteen-floor building. The exterior is faced with 2,000 tons of gray Bedford (Indiana) limestone.  The base of the main facade is trimmed with black granite. On the interior, a monumental 46-foot central dome rises through to the 4th floor.

References

		
National Register of Historic Places in Calhoun County, Michigan
Art Deco architecture in Michigan
Towers completed in 1931